Quency Leon Williams (April 10, 1961 – April 23, 2022) was an American gridiron football defensive end who played six seasons in the Canadian Football League (CFL) for the Calgary Stampeders and Winnipeg Blue Bombers. He played college football at Auburn and also had stints with the Birmingham Stallions, Los Angeles Raiders, Arizona Outlaws and BC Lions.

Early life and education
Williams was born on April 10, 1961, in Douglasville, Georgia, and grew up there. He attended Douglas County High School, graduating in 1980. He committed to Auburn University, and saw immediate playing time as a freshman on the football team. He played in every year at the school, and as a senior helped Auburn to the second-best run defense in the conference.

His brother Gregg Williams played college football for rival Georgia.

Professional career
Williams was selected in the 1984 USFL Territorial Draft by the Birmingham Stallions, but was one of the team's final roster cuts.

In , Williams was noticed by scouts of the Los Angeles Raiders, who gave him a tryout. His tryout was successful and he was given a contract, but did not make the final roster and was released at roster cuts.

In 1986, Williams was contacted by the Arizona Outlaws in the USFL, the Atlanta Falcons in the NFL, and by two teams from the Canadian Football League (CFL). He accepted an offer from Arizona, but the season was canceled before he got a chance to play.

In May , Williams was signed by the Calgary Stampeders of the CFL. His position was changed from defensive end to outside linebacker, but was later changed back. He made the final roster and played in a total of ten games in his first year, as Calgary compiled a record of 10–8. He was named the team's most valuable player by Canadian Airlines International and was awarded a trip to West Germany.

After the 1988 season ended, Williams tried out for the United States Bobsled Team.

In May , Williams was traded to the Winnipeg Blue Bombers for future considerations. He changed his position to linebacker near the beginning of the season. He made the final roster and appeared in seventeen games, making 65 tackles and eight sacks. That year, he played in fifteen games, making six sacks and 46 tackles as the Blue Bombers went on to win the 78th Grey Cup. In , he played in just seven games, recording two sacks and 15 tackles. In , he played in just one game before being released.

Shortly after being released by Winnipeg, Williams was signed by the BC Lions. He was released by the Lions on September 8.

Later life and death
Williams was later a professional truck driver near Winnipeg. In 2002, he helped save the life of a man who had crashed his van into a Manitoba river.

Williams died of a heart attack on April 23, 2022, at the age of 61, 13 days after his 61st birthday.

References

1961 births
2022 deaths
African-American players of American football
Players of American football from Georgia (U.S. state)
American players of Canadian football
American football defensive ends
American football linebackers
Auburn Tigers football players
Birmingham Stallions players
Los Angeles Raiders players
Arizona Outlaws players
Calgary Stampeders players
Winnipeg Blue Bombers players
BC Lions players
People from Douglasville, Georgia